Richmond River Light, also known as Ballina Head Light and Ballina Light,  is an active lighthouse located at Ballina Head, a headland in Ballina, New South Wales, Australia. The headland is at the northern side of the entrance to the Richmond River. It used to serve to guide ships into the river port and is used also serves as a leading light into the river, together with a steamer's masthead lantern with a 200 mm lens which is raised on a wooden structure  from it.

History 

The station was established with a temporary light that was installed in 1866 from plans by James Barnet, at the same time of the installation of the Clarence River Light.

The current lighthouse is one of five lighthouses of similar design designed and built by James Barnet in 1878–80, the other four being Fingal Head Light, Clarence River Light (now demolished), Tacking Point Lighthouse and Crowdy Head Light. A tender was called in 1878, it was built in 1879 and lit in 1880.

It was powered by colza oil. As the light was operated in conjunction with a nearby pilot station, only one light keeper was required.

In 1920 the light was converted to acetylene gas and automated.  In November 1940, the annexe and the porch connected to the lighthouse were demolished.

The light was electrified in the 1960s. The current light source is a 28,000 cd, 1,000 Watt 120 Volt tungsten-halogen lamp, and the power source is the Mains with a Battery standby. It shows a light characteristic of four white flashes every 16 s (Fl.(4)W. 16s)

Structure 

The tower is very similar in design to the other four lighthouses. The tower is constructed of stone, and cement rendered, and painted white. The platform can be reached by an iron stair inside the tower. Around the perimeter of the platform is a metal handrail. The platform is topped by the simple metal dome which houses the optical apparatus.

Originally the lighthouse had a porch, rectangular annexe for the duty room and oil store. These were all demolished in November 1940. A one-story keeper's house is still present at the premises.

Site operation 
The light is currently operated by Transport for NSW and the site is managed by the New South Wales Department of Lands.

Visiting 
The site is open to the public and accessible, but the tower is closed.

See also 

 List of lighthouses in Australia

Notes

References 

 
 
 
 
 

External links 

Lighthouses completed in 1866
Lighthouses completed in 1879
Lighthouses in New South Wales
1866 establishments in Australia
Ballina, New South Wales